The Schull and Skibbereen Railway (also known as the Schull and Skibbereen Tramway and Light Railway) was a minor narrow gauge railway in County Cork, Ireland. It opened in 1886 and closed in 1947. The track gauge was a  narrow gauge. The formal name of the company was The West Carberry Tramways and Light Railways Company Ltd.

Route

The S&S's main line was 15 ½ miles long. It was one of several in Ireland built under the terms of the Tramways Act 1883. It largely ran alongside roads, although a large 12-arched masonry viaduct was built over an inlet of Roaringwater Bay, and at times using gradients at steep as 1:30.

The line linked the small harbour and village at Schull (in Irish: Scoil Mhuire) with the town of Skibbereen (An Sciobairín). The only sizeable intermediate village was Ballydehob (Béal Átha an dá Chab), although the station was located inconveniently far from the village. The line was single track, with a passing place at Ballydehob station. Other halts were built at Newcourt, Church Cross, Hollyhill, Kilcoe and Woodlands (of which only Hollyhill had a station building).

The station at Skibbereen was built on a cramped site adjacent to that of the Cork, Bandon and South Coast Railway. The S&S trains had to reverse out of the station into a headshunt, before proceeding towards Schull. (A similar reversing operation is still required at Killarney railway station on Iarnród Éireann's line from Mallow to Tralee).

Early years
Construction was begun in 1885 and soon proved to be substandard. The Inspector of Railways refused to allow the line to be opened for public service in August 1886. Following some remedial work and a subsequent inspection, the line opened in September with a restricted speed limit of only 15 miles per hour. In October the service had to be suspended for 10 days owing to problems with both the track and the locomotives. Services had to again be suspended in April 1887, with local ratepayers having to subsidise the company. The Inspector of Railways gave a highly critical report of the line's standards of operation.

Following further losses, in 1892 the Grand Jury of County Cork appointed a committee of management to run the line. In 1893 a short extension to Schull Pier was built, qualifying for a grant as it was an existing railway, the justification being fish traffic.

Ownership by the GSR and CIÉ
In 1925 the company was incorporated into the new Great Southern Railways. Owing to a shortage of coal during World War II (known as The Emergency in neutral Ireland), services had to be suspended between April 1944 and December 1945. In 1945 the GSR was incorporated into Córas Iompair Éireann (CIÉ). A further shortage of coal resulted in a renewed suspension of services on 27 January 1947. The line never reopened; CIÉ formally abandoned the railway in September 1952.

Rolling stock
The line was operated by steam locomotives throughout its existence:
 SSLR 1 to 3 – Dick, Kerr 0-4-0T tramway locomotives of 1886 named Marion, Ida and Ilen.
 SSLR 4 – Nasmyth, Wilson & Co. 4–4–0T of 1888.
 SSLR 1 and 3 – Peckett and Sons 4–4–0T of 1906, and 1914.
 GSR 6S – ex CMLR 6.

Services
The standard train service, journey time 80 minutes, were two mixed trains a day. morning and evening, except Sunday were there was one, supplemented by additional trains on fair days.

See also
List of narrow gauge railways in Ireland
West Cork

Other narrow gauge railways in Co. Cork
Cork, Blackrock and Passage Railway
Cork and Muskerry Light Railway

References

Notes

Footnotes

Sources

Further reading

External links

Parliamentary question (in Dáil Éireann), 25 April 1944
S&SR on Trainweb

History of County Cork
Transport in County Cork
3 ft gauge railways in Ireland
Skibbereen
Railway companies established in 1883
Railway companies disestablished in 1925